George Otto Wirz (January 17, 1929 – November 23, 2010) served as a Roman Catholic auxiliary bishop of the Diocese of Madison, Wisconsin and titular bishop of Municipa.

Biography
Born in Monroe, Wisconsin, Wirz was ordained to the priesthood for the Madison Diocese on May 31, 1952. Bishop Wirz was the founding rector of the Holy Name Seminary.

On December 20, 1977, he was appointed auxiliary bishop of the Madison Diocese and was consecrated on March 9, 1978.

Bishop Wirz retired on February 10, 2004, and died in Madison, Wisconsin at age 81.

Notes

1929 births
2010 deaths
20th-century American Roman Catholic titular bishops
21st-century American Roman Catholic titular bishops
People from Monroe, Wisconsin
People from Madison, Wisconsin
Roman Catholic Diocese of Madison
Catholics from Wisconsin